The 2017–18 Hong Kong First Division League was the 4th season of Hong Kong First Division since it became the second-tier football league in Hong Kong in 2014–15. The season began on 9 September 2017 and ended on 20 May 2018.

Teams

Changes from last season

From First Division
Promoted to the Hong Kong Premier League
 None

Relegated to the Second Division
 Kwai Tsing
 Yau Tsim Mong

To First Division
Relegated from the Premier League
 South China
 HKFC

Promoted from the Second Division
 Sparta Rotterdam Mutual
 Hoi King

League table

References

Hong Kong First Division League seasons
2017–18 in Hong Kong football
Hong Kong